The Men of Atalissa is a 2014 documentary film by POV.org and The New York Times about 32 intellectually-disabled people who were employed by Texas-based Henry’s Turkey Service without proper compensation. They were abused physically and mentally, living in harsh conditions in Atalissa, Iowa for more than 30 years, beginning in the 1970s. The men processed meat for a wage of $65 a month and shelter in an old uphill schoolhouse. Their conditions were made public in 2009, leading to a $240 million jury verdict, subsequently reduced to $50,000 per person. The documentary is based on court records and internal documents of the company and features first-time interviews with seven of the victims.

References

POV (TV series) films
The New York Times
Equal Employment Opportunity Commission
Works about intellectual disability
Human trafficking in the United States
Human rights abuses in the United States
Documentary films about people with disability
All articles to be expanded
Documentary films about crime in the United States
Legal history of Iowa
Violence against men in North America